Noise in the Machine is the second EP by the British Darkwave band Massive Ego. It was the first release by the band's new label Out of Line Music, on 24 July 2015 and was a change from the old Euro dance sound of the band. It includes remixed versions of "I Idolize You", "Dead Silence" and "Generation V" by the new band member Lloyd Price ("Frixion"), Aesthetic Perfection and Leæther Strip, as well as the Zarkoff remix of "Low Life".

Two music videos were released to promote the EP, "I Idolize You (Modification Edit)"  and "Dead Silence Rising (Frixion Mix)"

Background
Lloyd Price joined Massive Ego in 2015 after leaving his previous band, Sigue Sigue Sputnik. Price had made the "Modification Remix" for the "I Idolize You" single in 2011, which was the beginning of the new musical direction of the band. A new edit was made for "I Idolize You", as well as remixes by Daniel Graves (Aesthetic Perfection) and Claus Larsen (Leæther Strip). "Generation V", previously released on Fuel for the Machine (2013), was remixed by Frixion, Price's side-project. Additional vocals were recorded for "Dead Silence", a single by Lia Organa & Electric Prince with Marc Massive on vocals, and was reworked to become "Dead Silence Rising".

Track listing

Personnel

 Lyrics, vocals: Marc Massive
 Remix: Lloyd Price (tracks 1, 2, 3, 6 and 7)
 Remix: Claus Larsen (track 4)
 Remix: Daniel Graves (track 5)
 Remix: Paul Rayner (track 8)
 Remix: Saša Rajković (track 9)
 Music by Empire State Human (track 9)
 Featured vocals: Maggie K DeMonde (track 9)
 Written by Charlie Mason and Richard Hymas (tracks 2 and 7)
 Vocal production by Barry Stone and Nik Crittenden
 Mastered by X-Fusion
 Photography by Mary Germanou
 Sleeve design: UserDX

References

External links
Official website

2015 EPs
Massive Ego albums